Susan Massitti-Stewart (born 14 December 1963 or February 1962) is a Canadian speed skater. She competed in the women's 3000 metres at the 1998 Winter Olympics. She participated at the World Allround Speed Skating Championships for Women in 1991, finishing 30th overall.

Records

Personal records

References

External links
 

1963 births
Living people
Canadian female speed skaters
Olympic speed skaters of Canada
Speed skaters at the 1998 Winter Olympics
Sportspeople from Alberta